The 1996 Strachan China Masters was an invitational non-ranking snooker tournament held in China in 1996. Rod Lawler won the tournament defeating Shokat Ali 6–3 in the final.

Results

References

China Masters (snooker)
1996 in snooker
1996 in Chinese sport